Gainsborough is a crater on Mercury. It has a diameter of 95 kilometers. Its name was adopted by the International Astronomical Union (IAU) in 1985. Gainsborough is named for the English painter Thomas Gainsborough, who lived from 1727 to 1788.

To the south of Gainsborough is Liang Kʽai crater.

References

Impact craters on Mercury